KVUE (channel 24) is a television station in Austin, Texas, United States, affiliated with ABC and owned by Tegna Inc. The station's studios are located on Steck Avenue just east of Loop 1 in northwest Austin, and its transmitter is located on the West Austin Antenna Farm northwest of downtown.

KVUE was the third television station established in Austin.

History

Pre-launch and construction
In the fall of 1961, the FCC began to receive applications for channel 24 in Austin. Applicants included Dalton Homer Cobb, a Midland oilman who owned that city's KDCD-TV (channel 18), and John R. Powley of Altoona, Pennsylvania (whose Texas Longhorn Broadcasting Company sought channel 67). They were soon followed by an Austin radio station in business for 15 years and also seeking channel 24: KVET (1300 AM), which filed on December 12, 1961, in anticipation of a future day when a UHF station could be viable. The Cobb and KVET bids were designated for hearing by the Federal Communications Commission (FCC) in 1962, and KVET got the nod on March 13, 1963.

While KVET manager Willard Deason announced the station would be built at "deliberate speed" and be on the air by early 1965, Austinites would have to wait some time to see it. In 1965, KVET was sold to Butler Broadcasting, channel 24 construction permit included. Butler announced a start date in February or March 1966, then a fall 1967 launch was floated.

KVET filed to sell the construction permit in 1968 to McAlister Television Enterprises, owner of KSEL-TV in Lubbock, for $44,000. McAlister sold a majority stake to several other investors which included former governor Allan Shivers, resulting in the creation of the Channel Twenty-Four Corporation as the assignee. The FCC approved in June 1970; the KVET-TV call letters were changed to KVUE, and a site in what was then far north Austin along Shoal Creek was selected for the studios,

The station signed on the air on September 12, 1971, after winds from Hurricane Fern delayed the intended start-up. KVUE was the market's first full-time ABC affiliate and finally gave the capital city the full program lineups from all three networks; prior to KVUE's sign-on, the network's programming had previously been limited to off-hours clearances on KTBC-TV and KHFI-TV.

Growth and ownership changes
In 1978, the Evening News Association, publisher of The Detroit News and owner of several television stations, purchased KVUE; it was the last locally-owned TV station in the market to be sold. Under Evening News, the station added  to its studio facility, doubling its size, in an expansion begun in 1985.

After a hostile takeover bid by Norman Lear and Jerry Perenchio was rebuffed, ENA put itself up and sale and was purchased by the Gannett Company in 1985, a transaction that closed in early 1986.

One of the state's most important owners of media properties was Belo Corporation. It owned The Dallas Morning News and TV stations in most of the state's important cities: KHOU-TV in Houston, WFAA-TV in Dallas, and KENS-TV in San Antonio. However, it lacked an Austin property and coveted one, particularly given its impending launch of Texas Cable News (TXCN). In February 1999, Gannett agreed to a trade with Belo: Belo received KVUE, while Gannett received KXTV in Sacramento, and $55 million. With the addition of KVUE, TXCN could provide news and information from the four largest cities in Texas.

On June 13, 2013, Gannett announced that it would acquire Belo for $1.5 billion. The sale was completed on December 23.

On June 29, 2015, the Gannett Company split in two, with one side specializing in print media and the other side specializing in broadcast and digital media. KVUE was retained by the latter company, named Tegna.

Pending sale to Cox Media Group 
On February 22, 2022, Tegna announced that it would be acquired by Standard General and Apollo Global Management for $5.4 billion. As a part of the deal, KVUE, along with its Dallas sister stations WFAA and KMPX, and Houston sister stations KHOU and KTBU would be resold to Cox Media Group.

News operation

KVUE was the first Austin-market television station to make a serious challenge in the local news race, which even after the introduction of two UHF competitors was dominated by KTBC. In May 1981, its Action News edged out KTBC at 6 and 10 p.m. The station remained a solid first place for the next several years, but a spirited competition emerged between channels 7 and 24 in the ratings for the rest of the decade, with KVUE and KTBC leading at different times. KVUE continued to dominate in the ratings after the 1995 switch of CBS and Fox affiliations, which caused KXAN to surge into second place and a slide for KTBC.

Under news director Carole Kneeland, who guided the KVUE newsroom from 1989 until her death from breast cancer in 1998, the station scaled back its crime coverage—which resulted in national attention and even a feature on ABC's Nightline—and introduced fact-checking of political advertising, a practice soon adopted by stations across the United States. However, by the last years of Gannett ownership, KXAN had started to edge ahead of KVUE, replacing KTBC as channel 24's main competition. The competition between channels 24 and 36 has generally defined Austin television news since; in May 2021, KVUE came second to KXAN in early and late evening news.

In 2014, KVUE won a Peabody Award for a documentary entitled The Cost of Troubled Minds, about Texas' underinvestment in addressing mental health care; this was the first Peabody won by an Austin television station.

On June 1, 2008, KVUE began broadcasting its local newscasts in high definition. With the transition, KVUE became the first Austin area station to implement HD weather graphics and broadcast field reports in the 16:9 widescreen format.

Sponsored content controversy
In 2021, the station was tricked into promoting a fake sexual wellness product, "invented" by a team working for late-night political commentary show Last Week Tonight, called the "Venus Veil", which was actually just a blanket; the show's team paid KVUE $2,650 to feature the fake product and an interview with its "creator" as a way to illustrate how stations such as KVUE promote sponsored content without being upfront about the sponsorship, essentially passing off advertising as news.

Notable former on-air staff
 Arthel Neville – reporter (later CNN and Fox News; most recently at KSWB-TV in San Diego)
 Fred Roggin – sports anchor (later with KNBC and now with KLAC in Los Angeles)
 Walt Maciborski — anchor
 Casey Stegall – anchor/reporter (2004-2005; now Los Angeles bureau correspondent at Fox News Channel)

Technical information

Subchannels
The station's digital signal is multiplexed:

Analog-to-digital conversion
KVUE shut down its analog signal on February 17, 2009, as part of the FCC-mandated transition to digital television for full-power stations (which Congress had moved the previous month to June 12). The station's digital signal remained on its pre-transition UHF channel 33, using PSIP to display KVUE's virtual channel as 24 on digital television receivers.

References

External links

VUE
ABC network affiliates
Estrella TV affiliates
True Crime Network affiliates
Quest (American TV network) affiliates
Circle (TV network) affiliates
Twist (TV network) affiliates
Tegna Inc.
Television channels and stations established in 1971
1971 establishments in Texas
Former Gannett subsidiaries